is a Japanese female racing driver. She is currently competing in the 2022 season of Formula Regional Japanese Championship, where she prematurely clinched the title with three races to spare.

Biography
Having started racing in karts, Koyama attended the Formula Toyota Racing School before moving to Japanese F4 in 2015.

In 2019, Koyama was announced as one of the 18 permanent drivers for the inaugural season of the W Series. At the first W Series round at Hockenheim, Koyama qualified 17th and finished 7th after setting the fastest lap of the race. During the remainder of the season, Koyama earned three more points finishes en route to 7th in the championship, and was named as a returning competitor for the 2020 W Series.

Racing record

Career summary

* Season still in progress.

Complete W Series results
(key) (Races in bold indicate pole position) (Races in italics indicate fastest lap)

* Season still in progress.

See also
List of female racing drivers

References

External links

Official blog 

Japanese racing drivers
1997 births
Living people
W Series drivers
F3 Asian Championship drivers
Formula Regional Japanese Championship drivers
Japanese female racing drivers
Toyota Gazoo Racing drivers
21st-century Japanese women
Japanese F4 Championship drivers
BlackArts Racing drivers
B-Max Racing drivers